The 2009 Hotel Shamo bombing was a suicide bombing at the Hotel Shamo in Mogadishu, Somalia, on 3 December 2009.  The bombing killed 25 people, including three ministers of the Transitional Federal Government, and injured 60 more, making it the deadliest attack in Somalia since the Beledweyne bombing on 18 June 2009 that claimed more than 30 lives.

The bombing

The attack took place inside the meeting hall of the Hotel Shamo in Mogadishu during a commencement ceremony for medical students of Benadir University and was carried out by a suicide bomber dressed as a woman, "complete with a veil and a female's shoes", according to Minister of Information Dahir Mohamud Gelle. According to witnesses, the bomber approached a speakers' panel, verbally greeted them with the phrase "peace", and detonated his explosives belt. Former Minister of Health Osman Dufle, who was speaking when the blast happened, reported that he had noticed an individual wearing black clothing moving through the audience immediately before the explosion.

The ceremony—the second since Benadir University was formed in 2002 and a rare event in war-torn Somalia—had attracted hundreds of people. In attendance were the graduates and their family members, University officials, and five ministers of the Transitional Federal Government (TFG). Security inside the meeting hall was light and all of the ministers' bodyguards were outside the hall.

Casualties

The bombing killed 24 people and injured 60 others. Most of those killed were students, but also among the dead were two doctors, three journalists, and three government ministers—Minister of Education Ahmed Abdulahi Waayeel, Minister of Health Qamar Aden Ali, and Minister of Higher Education Ibrahim Hassan Addow were killed. Minister of Sports Saleban Olad Roble was critically injured, and was hospitalised. He was later reported to have been flown to Saudi Arabia for treatment, where he died on 13 February 2010.

The three journalists killed in the bombing were: Mohamed Amiin Abdullah of Shabelle Media Network, a Somali television and radio network; freelance photographer Yasir Mairo, who died of injuries in hospital; and a cameraman alternately identified as freelancer Hassan Ahmed Hagi and Al Arabiya cameraman Hassan Zubeyr or Hasan al-Zubair. Their deaths raised to nine the number of journalists killed in Somalia during 2009, including four for Radio Shabelle. The explosion also injured six other journalists, including two—Omar Faruk, a photographer for Reuters, and Universal TV reporter Abdulkadir Omar Abdulle—who were taken to Medina Hospital in critical condition.

The dean of Benadir University's medical college was among the wounded.

Aftermath

No one immediately claimed responsibility for orchestrating the bombing, but Sheikh Sharif Sheikh Ahmed, the President of Somalia, blamed the Somali Islamist group al-Shabaab.

In a news conference held in the Hotel Shamo after the attack, President Ahmed called for international assistance to Somalia. He also displayed, according to a local journalist, what he identified as the bomber's body and remains of an explosive belt and a hijab. The Danish newspaper Berlingske Tidende reported the bomber was a 23-year-old citizen of Denmark.

According to Idd Mohamed, a senior Somali diplomat, the attack was carried out to foster "terror" and "panic" and undermine the legitimacy of the Transitional Federal Government. Wafula Wamunyini, the acting head of the African Union Mission to Somalia (AMISOM), expressed a similar opinion, claiming that the attack had the purpose of "intimidat[ing] and blackmail[ing]" the Somali government. Stephanie McCrummen of The Washington Post described the attack as "the worst blow in months" to the United Nations-supported government of Somalia.

Reactions
The attack drew condemnation from a number of organisations, including the African Union (AU), the European Union, the United Nations Security Council, and the National Union of Somali Journalists.

AMISOM described the bombing as "inhumane and cowardly", and characterised it as a "heinous [crime] against humanity". AMISOM also promised to "spare no efforts" to identify and bring to justice the perpetrators of the attack, and stated that the attack would not deter the AU from continuing to carry out its mission in Somalia.

Baroness Catherine Ashton, the High Representative for Common Foreign and Security Policy for the European Union (EU), echoed AMISOM's sentiment, calling the bombing a "cowardly attack against civilians including students, doctors and journalists".

The UN Security Council president Michel Kafando labelled the attack an act of terrorism and a "criminal act", called for a "thorough investigation", and conveyed "sympathies and condolences" to the victims of the attack, their families, the TFG, and the Somali people.

A joint statement by the UN, the EU, the Arab League and the United States affirmed that the international community would continue its support of the Transitional Federal Government; however, a senior European diplomat indicated that any additional military support to the TFG was unlikely.

President Ahmed characterised the attack as a "national disaster".

The Committee to Protect Journalists issued a statement expressing condolences to the families of the three journalists killed in the bombing and noted that the attack "cemented" Somalia's "position as the deadliest country in Africa for journalists".

See also
 2009 Beledweyne bombing
 List of journalists killed during the Somali civil war
 List of terrorist incidents, 2009
 Somali Civil War (2009–present)

References

External links

 In pictures: Mogadishu blast, BBC News
 Somalia bomb attack: 'Light turned to dark', BBC News
 "I Looked to My Right and Saw a Colleague Dead and Bleeding", The Wall Street Journal

Explosions in 2009
Somali Civil War (2009–present)
Mass murder in 2009
Terrorist incidents in Somalia in 2009
Suicide bombings in Somalia
21st century in Mogadishu
Attacks on hotels in Africa
Hotel bombings
December 2009 events in Africa
Building bombings in Somalia